Collateral consequences of criminal conviction are the additional civil state penalties, mandated by statute, that attach to a criminal conviction. They are not part of the direct consequences of criminal conviction, such as prison, fines, or probation. They are the further civil actions by the state that are triggered as a consequence of the conviction.

In some jurisdictions, a judge, finding a defendant guilty of a crime, can order that no conviction be recorded, thereby relieving the person of the collateral consequences of a criminal conviction.

Introduction
If a defendant is found guilty of a crime or pleads guilty, the judge or other sentencing authority imposes a sentence. A sentence can take a number of forms, such as loss of privileges (e.g. driving), house arrest, community service, probation, fines and imprisonment. Collectively, these sentences are referred to as direct consequences – those intended by the judge, and frequently mandated at least in part by an applicable law or statute.

However, beyond the terms of the sentence, a defendant can experience additional state actions that are considered by the state to be collateral consequences such as: disenfranchisement (in some countries this may be separately meted out), disentitlement of education loans (for drug charges in the United States), loss of a professional license, or eviction from public housing. These consequences are not imposed directly by the judge, and are beyond the terms of a sentence itself for the actual crime. Instead, they are civil state actions and are referred to as collateral consequences. In most jurisdictions, being charged with a crime can trigger state civil action in the form of an investigation to determine if the charges trigger the civil statutes that attach to the criminal charges. An example would be criminal charges that can trigger deportation, or the revocation of a professional license, such as a medical, nursing, or pharmacist license. Being subject to collateral consequences has been called a form of civil death.

A person accused or convicted of a crime may suffer social consequences of a conviction, such as loss of a job and social stigma. These social consequences, whether or not they lead to convictions, can arise in countries where arrests and legal proceedings are matters of public record, thus disseminating the information about the event to the public to the detriment of the accused.

Collateral consequences in Australia
In general, the collateral consequences of a criminal conviction are similar to those in other countries. A non-citizen who fails the character requirements of the Department of Immigration and Border Protection may:
 be denied entry or re-entry into Australia, if outside Australia
 have their visa cancelled, requiring them to leave or to be removed from Australia.

Circumstances under which a non-citizen will fail the character test include one or more terms of imprisonment, totalling 12 or more months, whether the imprisonment took place in Australia or overseas.

In most jurisdictions, persons who are serving prison terms may be disqualified to vote.

In some jurisdictions, a judge, finding a person guilty of an offence, can order that no conviction be recorded, thereby relieving the person of the collateral and social consequences of a conviction.

Collateral consequences in Canada

Collateral consequences were defined by Justice Wagner of the Supreme Court of Canada in R v Pham in 2013. Justice Wagner defined collateral consequences broadly, stating that they are "any consequences for the impact of the sentence on the particular offender." He ruled that judges can take collateral consequences into account during the sentencing procedure, so long as the sentence they impose is proportionate and they do not impose "inappropriate or artificial sentences" that circumvent "Parliament's will". Justice Wagner also stated that, at least in the case of collateral consequences involving immigration, appellate courts can intervene to change a sentence if the trial judge was not aware that such a consequence would arise as a result of his or her sentence.

The issue arose in Pham because under Canadian federal law, a resident of Canada who is not a citizen can be removed from Canada if the person is convicted of certain types of criminal offences. The removal process is not part of the sentence for the criminal offence, and therefore is a collateral consequence. Once a non-resident person is required to leave Canada because of a criminal conviction, they are not entitled to come back to Canada unless they meet the rehabilitation requirements. A non-resident who is convicted of an offence carrying a life sentence is normally barred from Canada for life, if released from incarceration.

R. v. Pham involved an offender whose sentence would have made him ineligible to appeal his deportation if it were not reduced in length by one day. Neither the sentencing judge nor the offender's lawyers were aware of the potential immigration consequences at the time of sentencing. At the Supreme Court, Justice Wagner concluded that, had the sentencing judge been aware of the collateral consequences, he or she would have imposed a sentence that avoided them. He therefore reduced the length of the offender's sentence by one day.

Following the Supreme Court's decision in R. v. Pham, lower courts extended its applicability to other collateral consequences. For example, courts have held that stigma or the loss of employment following a conviction to be collateral consequences that can be taken into account during sentencing. The British Columbia Court of Appeal also ruled that a "lifetime ban...from income and disability assistance as a result of conviction..." is a collateral consequence and that a more lenient sentence may be imposed to avoid such a consequence.

Collateral consequences in New Zealand

Collateral consequences are generally, more or less, similar to those in the countries mentioned earlier. Any non-citizen to whom the following applies will generally not be allowed to reside in or visit New Zealand:
 deportation from any country
 a prison sentence, or series of such sentences, adding up to 5 or more years
 in the past 10 years, a sentence of imprisonment of 12 or more months (other than a sentence covered in (2) above).

Collateral consequences in the United Kingdom

Such consequences can include:
loss of professional licence (particularly within occupations covered by the Common Law Police Disclosure policy)
deportation (if not a citizen)
loss of ability to obtain a heavy goods vehicle or passenger carrying vehicle licence after a conviction for some serious driving offences, particularly those causing death
loss of ability to legally possess a firearm

Some limitations are in place in England and Wales due to the Rehabilitation of Offenders Act 1974, though this includes a number of exceptions.

Collateral consequences in the United States

Outline of collateral consequences
In the United States, collateral consequences can include loss or restriction of a professional license, ineligibility for public funds including welfare benefits and student loans, loss of voting rights, ineligibility for jury duty, and deportation for immigrants, including those who, while not American citizens, hold permanent resident status.

In general, all states impose such consequences except in situations where criminal charges are dropped or dismissed. In all jurisdictions throughout the U.S., judges are not obligated to warn of these collateral consequences upon a finding of guilt by trial, or prior to an admission of guilt by plea agreement, except as regards deportation. Deportation has been made an exception by the Supreme Court in Padilla v. Commonwealth of Kentucky.

There are currently few legal remedies available for these collateral consequences. In recent years, some governmental organizations have, however, discouraged actions that would cause unfairly harsh collateral consequences; for example, the Equal Employment Opportunity Commission (EEOC) urges human resources managers not to automatically exclude all ex-convicts from employment consideration, particularly if they are members of minorities with disproportionate incarceration rates.

Efforts to include collateral consequences in sentencing in the United States
If a defendant is punished beyond the sentence prescribed by law (that is, if collateral consequences do occur), the punishment is then more severe than that intended or warranted. In the worst case, this might violate protections under the United States Constitution, including the Eighth Amendment, which forbids "cruel and unusual punishments".

The Supreme Court of the United States addressed collateral consequences of criminal convictions as early as 1984. In Strickland v. Washington, the Court explored ineffective assistance of counsel with respect to collateral consequences of criminal convictions. In evaluating competence, the Court explained, judges should look at all relevant circumstances and evidence of appropriate measures of professional behavior, such as the ABA Standards for Criminal Justice ("ABA Standards"). The ABA Standards require defense lawyers to consider collateral consequences of conviction. Judges, accordingly, should monitor the performance of counsel. States chose to apply this rule in varying ways.

Strickland encouraged but did not mandate consideration of collateral consequences. Some claim that structural incentives exist for lawyers to not elicit information relevant to collateral consequences because doing so may prolong a case; others note that no attorney or judge could predict any and all collateral consequences of a criminal conviction. Since Strickland did not require an analysis of collateral consequences, they generally are not regarded as cause to overturn criminal convictions. However, some argue that the Constitution should require consideration of collateral consequences.

Most states do not accord equal legal effect to the collateral consequences of criminal convictions. For example, in New York the consideration of certain collateral consequences is merely discretionary, while the elucidation of direct consequences is required. For instance, in People v. Peque, New York's highest court overruled the portion of its prior ruling in People v. Ford that "a court's failure to advise a defendant of potential deportation never affects the validity of the defendant's plea," but still held that a trial court had different duties with regard to direct versus collateral consequences of guilty pleas.

Likewise, the Kentucky Supreme Court in Commonwealth v. Fuartado, 170 S.W.3d 384 (Ky. 2005) held that the failure of defense counsel to advise a defendant of potential deportation did not give rise to a claim of ineffective assistance of counsel.

Rulings regarding deportation were superseded by Padilla v. Kentucky in 2010. "... counsel must inform her client whether his plea carries a risk of deportation." The United States Supreme Court held that the collateral consequence of deportation was a consequence of such great importance that failure by counsel to advise the defendant of deportation is ineffective assistance of counsel which is a constitutional protection under the Sixth Amendment. After Padilla, there has been significant litigation in the lower courts about whether attorneys are required to advise their criminal clients about other consequences of convictions.

In 2004, the Public Defender Service of the District of Columbia assembled a document outlining some collateral consequences.  

In May 2005, Chief Judge Judith S. Kaye of the New York State Court of Appeals organized the Partners in Justice Colloquium to address the issue of collateral consequences. Judge Kaye formed a working group which, in partnership with the Lawyering in the Digital Age Clinic at the Columbia University Law School, created a site that, for the first time, collects academic works, court opinions, and professionals' resources (by virtue of a message board and database) in one place. The Columbia University Law School in collaboration with the Columbia Center for New Media Teaching and Learning developed and  a Collateral Consequences Calculator for looking up and comparing collateral consequences of criminal charges in New York State.

In 2009, the American Bar Association created the National Inventory of Collateral Consequences of Conviction, a searchable database of the collateral consequences in all U.S. Jurisdictions. The National Inventory of Collateral Consequences of Conviction is supported by a grant from the Bureau of Justice Assistance, Office of Justice Programs, U.S. Department of the Justice. This project was initially supported by Award No.2009-IJ-CX-0102 awarded by the National Institute of Justice, Office of Justice Programs, U.S. Department of Justice and by the ABA Criminal Justice Section.

In Federal law, the federal sentencing guidelines have a model for collateral consequences which is determined by the date of when the offense was committed and by the type of the offense.

See also

Employment discrimination against persons with criminal records in the United States
Loss of rights due to conviction for criminal offense

Padilla v. Commonwealth of Kentucky

References

External links
 Strickland v. Washington
 People v. Ford
 Commonwealth v. Fuartado, 170 S.W.3d 384 (Ky. 2005)
 The Collateral Consequences Calculator
 ABA Standards for Criminal Justice: Collateral Sanctions and Discretionary Disqualification of Convicted Persons (3d ed. 2004)
 Uniform Law Commission, Uniform Collateral Consequences of Conviction Act (2009)

United States criminal law
Criminal justice ethics